The canton of Haguenau is an administrative division of the Bas-Rhin department, northeastern France. Its borders were modified at the French canton reorganisation which came into effect in March 2015. Its seat is in Haguenau.

It consists of the following communes:

Batzendorf
Berstheim
Dauendorf
Haguenau
Hochstett
Huttendorf
Morschwiller
Niederschaeffolsheim
Ohlungen
Schweighouse-sur-Moder
Uhlwiller
Wahlenheim
Wintershouse
Wittersheim

References

Cantons of Bas-Rhin